Nancy Alaan Catamco is a Filipina politician and the incumbent governor of the Province of Cotabato. She became the 25th governor and the 3rd female governor of the province when she was elected to the position in 2019. She is also the 1st governor from the Indigenous Bagobo-Obo Manobo people. Catamco was a former member of the House of Representative representing the 2nd Congressional District of the Province of Cotabato for three consecutive terms (2010-2019).

Political career
Representative of the 2nd Legislative District of the Province of Cotabato (2010-2019)

Catamco was elected for three consecutive terms as representative of the 2nd Legislative District of Cotabato Province from 2010 to 2019.

As a congresswoman, Catamco was involved in the advocacy for the rights, interests, and concerns of Indigenous peoples in the House of Representatives. She fought to ensure the full implementation of Republic Act No. 8371 otherwise known as the Indigenous People’s Rights Act 1997. She also pushed for the implementation of Indigenous Peoples Mandatory Representative in the sanggunians of Cotabato Province and in all sanggunians in the country.

During her term as representative, she authored and co-authored bills related to education, agriculture, labor, health, senior citizens, women and youth. She also filed bills in the House of Representatives related to Indigenous peoples.

Suspension as governor
On July 4, 2019, the Supreme Court of the Philippines suspended Catamco as North Cotabato governor for 90 days as she was facing graft and malversation charges relating to allegedly supplying overpriced fertilizers to Poro town in Cebu in 2004. The Anti-Graft and Corrupt Practices Act mandates such preventative suspensions for any public official facing charges in the Sandiganbayan, to prevent the official from gaining an advantage from his government position.

Catamco was replaced by Vice Governor Emmylou Taliño-Mendoza from August 23, 2019, to November 21, 2019.

The Supreme Court ordered the Sandiganbayan to dismiss the graft case against her in July 2020.

Personal life
Nancy Catamco was born in Barangay Saguing, Makilala, Cotabato, on June 19, 1969, and the 4th child of Proceso and Minda Catamco. After finishing  basic education at Kidapawan City Pilot Elementary School and Kidapawan City National High School, she went to Ateneo de Davao University to earn her AB English degree. She continued her post-graduate studies with units in guidance and counselling from the Alliance Graduate School. She has 2 sons, Nathaniel Phillipe and Patrick Nikolai.

References

External links
Province of Cotabato Official Website

Living people
1969 births
People from Cotabato City
Governors of Cotabato
Members of the House of Representatives of the Philippines from Cotabato
PDP–Laban politicians
Manobo people